Brandon Boor (born 27 March 1988 in Cairns, Queensland) is an Australian former rugby league footballer who played in the 2000s. He made his National Rugby League debut for the North Queensland Cowboys in Round 16, 2008, against the South Sydney Rabbitohs.

References

External links
Brandon Boor at North Queensland Cowboys
Courier-Mail profile

1988 births
Living people
Australian rugby league players
Australian people of Cook Island descent
Australian sportspeople of Samoan descent
North Queensland Cowboys players
Northern Pride RLFC players
Rugby league wingers
Rugby league players from Cairns